Haoma (Avestan: 𐬵𐬀𐬊𐬨𐬀) is a divine plant in Zoroastrianism and in later Persian culture and mythology. Haoma has its origins in Indo-Iranian religion and is the cognate of Vedic soma.

Etymology
Both Avestan haoma and Sanskrit soma derived from proto-Indo-Iranian *sauma. The linguistic root of the word haoma, hu-, and of soma, su-, suggests 'press' or 'pound'.

In Old Persian cuneiform it was known as 𐏃𐎢𐎶 hauma, as in the DNa inscription (c. 490 BC) which makes reference to "haoma-drinking Scythians" (Sakā haumavargā).

The Middle Persian form of the name is 𐭧𐭥𐭬 hōm, which continues to be the name in Modern Persian, and other living Iranian languages (هوم).

As a plant

In the Avesta
The physical attributes, as described in the texts of the Avesta, include:
 the plant has stems, roots and branches (Yasna 10.5).
 it has a plant asu (Yasna 9.16). The term asu is only used in conjunction with a description of haoma, and does not have an established translation. It refers to 'twigs' according to Dieter Taillieu, 'stalk' according to Robert Wasson, 'fibre' or 'flesh' according to Ilya Gershevitch, 'sprouts' according to Lawrence Heyworth Mills.
 it is tall (Yasna 10.21, Vendidad 19.19)
 it is fragrant (Yasna 10.4)
 it is golden-green (standard appellation, Yasna 9.16 et al.)
 it can be pressed (Yasna 9.1, 9.2)
 it grows on the mountains, 'swiftly spreading', 'apart on many paths' (Yasna 9.26, 10.3-4 et al.) 'to the gorges and abysses' (Yasna 10–11) and 'on the ranges' (Yasna 10.12)

The indirect attributes (i.e. as effects of its consumption) include:
 it furthers healing (Yasna 9.16-17, 9.19, 10.8, 10.9)
 it furthers sexual arousal (Yasna 9.13-15, 9.22)
 it is physically strengthening (Yasna 9.17, 9.22, 9.27)
 it stimulates alertness and awareness (Yasna 9.17, 9.22, 10.13)
 the mildly intoxicating extract can be consumed without negative side effects (Yasna 10.8).
 it is nourishing (Yasna 9.4, 10.20) and 'most nutritious for the soul' (Yasna 9.16).

In present-day Zoroastrianism
Many of the physical attributes as described in the texts of the Avesta match the plant used in present-day Zoroastrian practice. In present-day preparation of parahaoma (for details, see Ab-Zohr), ...
 the twigs are repeatedly pounded in the presence of a little water, which suggests ancient haoma was also water-soluble.
 the twigs have to be imported by Indian-Zoroastrians, who believe that they are, for climatic reasons, not obtainable on the Indian subcontinent.
 very small quantities are produced.

According to Falk, Parsi-Zoroastrians use a variant of ephedra, usually Ephedra procera, imported from the Hari River valley in Afghanistan.

Botanic identification

Since the late 18th century, when Anquetil-Duperron and others made portions of the Avesta available to western scholarship, several scholars have sought a representative botanical equivalent of the haoma as described in the texts and as used in living Zoroastrian practice. Most of the proposals concentrated on either linguistic evidence or comparative pharmacology or reflected ritual use. Rarely were all three considered together, which usually resulted in such proposals being quickly rejected.

In the late 19th century, the highly conservative Zoroastrians of Yazd (Iran) were found to use genus Ephedra, which was locally known as hum or homa and which they exported to the Indian Zoroastrians. The plant, as Falk also established, requires a cool and dry climate, i.e. it does not grow in India (which is either too hot or too humid or both) but thrives in central Asia. Later, it was discovered that a number of Iranian languages and Persian dialects have hom or similar terms as the local name for some variant of Ephedra. Considered together, the linguistic and ritual evidence appeared to conclusively establish that haoma was some variant of Ephedra.

In the latter half of the 20th century, several studies attempted to establish haoma as a psychotropic substance, and based their arguments on the assumption that proto-Indo-Iranian sauma was a hallucinogen. This assumption relies on Rigveda Mandala 8, Hymn 48.   and  reject this assumption, positing that souma was not hallucinogenic.  Considering all 115 hymns dedicated to souma in whole, rather than the single hymn RV 8.48, and modern usage of Ephedra by practitioners, Falk and Houben conclude that Ephedra could be the only logical identity of souma. Moreover, the references to entheogenic properties were only in conjunction with a fermentation of the plant extract, which does not have enough time to occur in living custom.

In the conclusion of his observations on a 1999 Haoma-Soma workshop in Leiden, Jan E. M. Houben writes: "despite strong attempts to do away with Ephedra by those who are eager to see sauma as a hallucinogen, its status as a serious candidate for the Rigvedic Soma and Avestan Haoma still stands". This supports Falk, who in his summary noted that "there is no need to look for a plant other than Ephedra, the one plant used to this day by the Parsis."

As a divinity (Dūraoša) 
The Yazata Haoma, also known by the middle Persian name Hōm Yazad, is the epitome of the quintessence of the haoma plant, venerated in the Hōm Yašt, the hymns of Yasna 9-11.

In those hymns, Haoma is said to appear before Zoroaster in the form of Dūraoša, a "beautiful man" (this is the only anthropomorphic reference), who prompts him to gather and press haoma for the purification of the waters (see Aban). Haoma is  'righteous' and 'furthers righteousness', is 'wise' and 'gives insight' (Yasna 9.22). Haoma was the first priest, installed by Ahura Mazda with the sacred girdle aiwiyanghana (Yasna 9.26) and serves the Amesha Spentas in this capacity (Yasht 10.89). "Golden-green eyed" Haoma was the first to offer up haoma, with a "star-adorned, spirit-fashioned mortar," and is the guardian of "mountain plants upon the highest mountain peak." (Yasht 10.90)

Haoma is associated with the Amesha Spenta Vohu Manah (Avestan, middle Persian Vahman or Bahman), the guardian of all animal creation. Haoma is the only divinity with a Yasht who is not also represented by a day-name dedication in the Zoroastrian calendar. Without such a dedication, Haoma has ceased to be of any great importance within the Zoroastrian hierarchy of angels.

In tradition and folklore

In the legend of Zoroaster's conception
The Haoma plant is a central element in the legend surrounding the conception of Zoroaster. 
In the story, his father Pouroshaspa took a piece of the Haoma plant and mixed it with milk. He gave his wife Dugdhova one half of the mixture and he consumed the other. They then conceived Zoroaster who was instilled with the spirit of the plant.

According to tradition, Zoroaster received his revelation on a riverbank while preparing parahaoma for the Ab-Zohr (Zatspram 21.1), that is, for the symbolic purification of Aban ("the waters"). This symbolic purification is also evident in Yasna 68.1, where the celebrant makes good for the damage done to water by humanity: "These offerings, possessing haoma, possessing milk, possessing pomegranate, shall compensate thee".

traditional barsom
It is possible that the barsom (Var. Avestan baresman) bundle of twigs was originally a bundle of Haoma stalks. The Haoma divinity is identified with priesthood (see Haoma as a divinity), while the barsom stalks "cut for the bundles bound by women" (Yasna 10.17) is the symbol and an instrument of Zoroastrian priests. Today the barsom is made from pomegranate twigs (cf: preparation of parahaoma for the Ab-Zohr).

In the Shahnameh 
In Ferdowsi's Shahnameh, which incorporates stories from the Avesta (with due acknowledgement), Hom appears as a hermit, dweller of the mountains, incredibly strong. He binds Afrasiab (middle Persian, Avestan: "the fell Turanian Frangrasyan", Yasna 11.7) with the sacred girdle, and drags him from deep within the earth (named the hankana in Avestan, hang-e-Afrasiab in middle Persian) where Afrasaib has his "metal-encircled" kingdom that is immune to mortal attack.

In another episode, Vivaŋhat is the first of the humans to press haoma, for which Hom rewards him with a son, Jamshid. Yasna 9.3-11 has Zoroaster asking the divinity who (first) prepared haoma and for what reward, to which Haoma recalls Vivanghvant (Persian: Vivaŋhat) to whom Yima Xshaeta (Jamshid) is born; Athwya (Abtin) to whom Thraetaona (Fereydun) is born; and Thrita to whom Urvaxshaya and Keresaspa (Karshasp and Garshasp) are born. The latter two are also characters in priestly heroic tradition, and among conservative Zoroastrians of the hereditary priesthood, Haoma is still prayed to by those wanting children (in particular, honorable sons who will also become priests).
The account given in the Indian Vedas closely agrees with that of the Iranian Avesta.  The first preparers of Soma are listed as Vivasvat, who is the father of Yama and Manu, and Trita Aptya.

Darmesteter
James Darmesteter, in his 1875 thesis on the mythology of the Avesta, speculating on the Parsi belief that Ephedra twigs do not decay, wrote:... it comprises the power of life of all the vegetable kingdom ... both the Ved[as] and the Avesta call it the 'king of healing herbs' ... the zarathustri scriptures say that homa is of two kinds, the white haoma and the painless tree. Could it be that soma is the tree of life? the giver of immortality?

The Indian-Zoroastrian belief mentioned above also manifests itself in the present-day Zoroastrian practice of administering a few drops of parahaoma to the new-born or dying (see Ab-Zohr). The belief also appears to be very old, and be cross-cultural. As Falk, recalling Aurel Stein's discovery of Ephedra plants interred at 1st-century CE Tarim Basin burial sites, notes: "an imperishable plant, representing or symbolizing the continuity of life, is most appropriate to burial rites".

In the Zadspram
A legendary 'White Hom' grows at the junction of the "great gathering place of the waters"  and a mighty river. According to the Zadspram, at the end of time, when Ormuzd triumphs over Ahriman, the followers of the good religion will share a parahom made from the 'White Hom',  and so attain immortality for their resurrected bodies. (Zadspram 35.15)

Comparison of haoma/soma
Beyond the establishment of a common origin of haoma and soma and numerous attempts to give that common origin a botanical identity, little has been done to compare the two. As Indologist Jan Houben also noted in the proceedings of a 1999 workshop on Haoma-Soma, "apart from occasional and dispersed remarks on similarities in structure and detail of Vedic and Zoroastrian rituals, little has been done on the systematic comparison of the two". As of 2003, no significant comparative review of cultural/sacred Haoma/Soma had extended beyond Alfred Hillebrandt's 1891 comparison of the Vedic deity and the Zoroastrian divinity.

All more recent studies that address commonality have dealt only with botanical identification of proto-Indo-Iranian *sauma. Houben's workshop, the first of its kind, dealt with "the nature of the Soma/Haoma plant and the juice pressed from it" and that "the main topic of the workshop (was) the identity of the Soma/Haoma."

See also
 Botanical identity of soma-haoma
 Ab-Zohr, preparation and use of parahaoma in this rite
 Soma, the Vedic equivalent of Haoma.
 Tree of life

References

Bibliography

 
 
  
 
 
 
 
  
 
 
 

 
Ancient Iranian religion
Yazatas
Entheogens
Persian mythology